2008 Japanese Super Cup was the Japanese Super Cup competition. The match was played at National Stadium in Tokyo on March 1, 2008. Sanfrecce Hiroshima won the championship.

Match details

References

Japanese Super Cup
2008 in Japanese football
Kashima Antlers matches
Sanfrecce Hiroshima matches
Japanese Super Cup 2008